Sunjiawan Township is an rural township in Liling City, Zhuzhou City, Hunan Province, People's Republic of China.

Administrative divisions
The township is divided into 6 villages, the following areas: Lijiashan Village, Sunjiawan Village, Xi'an Village, Longhuwan Village, Wenjiawan Village, and Guanqian Village (李家山村、孙家湾村、西岸村、龙虎湾村、文家湾村、观前村).

External links

Divisions of Liling